Montserrat Minobis i Puntonet (24 October 1942 - 11 May 2019) was a Spanish feminist journalist.

Biography
Montserrat Minobis i Puntonet was born in Figueras on 24 October 1942. She was committed to the anti-Franco struggle of the 1970s and was an activist in defense of Catalan culture. She affiliated with various political formations. In the 1990s, she was president of the European Network of Women Journalists and the Association of Women Journalists of Catalonia. From 2001 to 2004, she was dean of the College of Journalists of Catalonia. She was the recipient of several awards, including the Creu de Sant Jordi from the Generalitat de Catalunya. She died in Barcelona on 11 May 2019.

Selected works
 1986, Aureli M. Escarré, Abat de Montserrat (1946-1968)

Awards and honors
1987, Ciutat de Barcelona Award for the Barcelona Oberta program of Ràdio4 from RNE to Catalunya
1990, Espais of the Center d'Art Contemporàni Espais de Girona
1991, Atlàntida, the Nit de l'Edició. Gremi d'Editors de Catalunya
1992, Ràdio d'Omnium Cultural. Nit of Santa Llúcia
1993, Premi de l'entitat Ciemen
1996, Creu de Sant Jordi. Generalitat de Catalunya

References

1942 births
2019 deaths
People from Figueres
Journalists from Catalonia
Spanish women journalists
Academics from Catalonia
Spanish women academics
Academic staff of Pompeu Fabra University
Spanish feminist writers